Brussells (also spelled Brussels) is an unincorporated community in Lincoln County, in the U.S. state of Missouri.

History
A post office called Brussells was established in 1876, and remained in operation until 1907. The name is a transfer from Brussels, the capital of Belgium.

References

Unincorporated communities in Lincoln County, Missouri
Unincorporated communities in Missouri